The War Delegation (or KD) is a standing committee of the Riksdag, with its functions enumerated in the Instrument of Government and the Riksdag Act, with the purpose of replacing the Riksdag as a whole whenever Sweden is at war or is otherwise exposed to a serious threat or crisis. 

The War Delegation is chaired by the Speaker of the Riksdag and has fifty members who are elected following each general election, for a total of 51 members. The Delegation has roughly the same powers as the Riksdag, but may not call snap elections or suspend ordinary elections. 

If Sweden is at war the members of the Advisory Council on Foreign Affairs can, if possible after consultation with the Prime minister of Sweden, enact that the delegation will take the place of the Riksdag. If the Advisory Council on Foreign Affairs is hindered to meet the Government of Sweden can decide the same. Since it is the member of the Advisory Council that makes the decision, the King of Sweden who is the president of the advisory council, does not partake in the decision.

If Sweden is in danger of war the decision to call the War Delegation is decided in unison between the Advisory Council on Foreign Affairs and the Prime minister. In order for it to have effect the Prime minister and at least 6 of the members of the Advisory Council must vote in its favor.

See also
Government of Sweden
Monarchy of Sweden
Elverum Authorization (Declaration of the Storting in Norway during World War II)

References 

 Kungörelse (1974:152) om beslutad ny regeringsform: 15. kap "Krig och krigsfara" 2-3 § [Instrument of Government 15th Chapiter "War and threat of war" 2-3 §] (in Swedish).

Riksdag